Barbara Andrews is an American writer of 20 romance novels under her real name; with her daughter, Pam Hanson, she now writes under the pseudonyms Jennifer Drew and Pam Rock.

Biography 
Barbara Andrews wanted a career she could combine with motherhood and four children. She made her first sale to Highlights for Children, when her children were in kindergarten. She is the author of 20 romance novels under her own name.

Andrews's daughter, Pam Hanson, majored in journalism in college and later worked as a reporter. Pam married a college professor and started a family. After the birth of her first child, Pam teamed up with her mother to write romance novels. Together they have published novels under the pseudonyms Jennifer Drew and Pam Rock.

For several years, their partnership was long-distance, but nowadays they share a house in West Virginia, along with Pam's husband and their two sons, Erik and Andrew Hanson. In the summer of 2008, she moved to Nebraska with Pam and her family.

Awards and honors
As Jennifer Drew, the mother and daughter were nominated for a Romantic Times Reviewers' Choice Award in 2003, and for Best Harlequin Duets for the novel Desperately Seeking Sully.

Biography

As Barbara Andrews

Single novels 
Love Trap	1982/10
Stolen Promises	1983/01
This Bittersweet Love	1983/02
Emerald Fire	1983/08
Passionate Deceiver	1983/09
Happily Ever After	1984/10
Midnight Magic	1984/12
Shady Business	1984/12
My Kind of Love	1985/01
A Novel Affair	1985/03
Loving Lessons	1985/05
Reach for the Sky	1985/05
Stand-in Lover	1985/09
Add a Dash of Love	1985/12
A Different Kind of Man	1986/04
Seduced by a Stranger	1986/12
Trapped by Desire	1986/12
Escape From the Storm	1987/01
Summer of Promises	1987/06

As Jennifer Drew

Single novels 
Turn Back the Night	1994/10
Dear Mr. Right	1996/09
The Prince and the Bogus Bride	1997/12
The Bad-Girl Bride	1998/10
Baby Lessons	1999/12
Stop the Wedding!	2002/03
Just Desserts	2002/07
Hitched for the Holidays	2002/12
You'll Be Mine in 99	2003/05
Desperately Seeking Sully	2003/08
All Wrapped Up	2003/12
The Banker's Convenient Wife	2004/04

Grant Sisters series 
Taming Luke	1999/08
Mr. Right Under Her Nose	2001/02

Bailey Brothers series 
One Bride too Many	2001/09
One Groom to Go	2001/09

As Pam Rock 
Mercy's Mission, 2002/02
Moon of Desire
Star Searcher

References

External links
 Barbara Andrews at Fantastic-Fiction and Jennifer Drew at Fantastic-Fiction
 Harlequin Editorial Ltd Website
 Jennifer Drew at Mills & Boon Website

Living people
American romantic fiction writers
Year of birth missing (living people)
Place of birth missing (living people)